Éditions Xavier Barral is a French book publisher specialising in photography, architecture, contemporary art and science. It was founded in 2002 by Xavier Barral and based in Paris.

Martin Parr has said of Éditions Xavier Barral that "Every book published [by] Barral has a specific problem to which it brings an original solution tailored to this project and to no other". Cheryl Newman, writing in The Daily Telegraph in 2013, described it as "offering an irresistible collection of tomes".

Awards
2013: Antoine D'Agata's Anticorps (Xavier Barral and Le Bal, 2013), won the Rencontres d'Arles Author’s Book Award.
2015: Images of Conviction: The Construction of Visual Evidence (Xavier Barral and Le Bal, 2015) won Photography Catalogue of the Year, Paris Photo–Aperture Foundation PhotoBook Awards.

People published by Éditions Xavier Barral

References

External links

Visual arts publishing companies
Book publishing companies of France
French brands
Companies based in Paris
Publishing companies established in 2002
2002 establishments in France